Kumar Sarvjeet (born 3 April 1975) is an Indian Politician who is currently serving as Minister of Tourism, Bihar, and as the Member of The Bihar Legislative Assembly from Bodh Gaya. He is the son of Member of Parliament, Lok Sabha Late Rajesh Kumar. He is also a Social Worker along with the member of the Rashtriya Janata Dal, the largest political party in the state of Bihar, India. He was elected twice as the representative of the Bodh Gaya (Vidhan Sabha constituency) and broke the record of 63 years. He belongs to Dalit Community names Paswan commonly known as Dusadh a Backward Caste. He entered politics after the murder of his father Rajesh Kumar Member of Parliament, Lok Sabha from Gaya (Lok Sabha constituency).

Early life 
Kumar Sarvjeet was born in a Dalit community, which is categorised as a Scheduled Caste by the Indian government, a Dusadh (Paswan)  family on 3 April 1975 in a village Chahal Mundera in Gaya district of Bihar to Chandra Mani Devi and Rajesh Kumar, later Member of Parliament, Lok Sabha from Gaya (Lok Sabha constituency). He is the eldest brother among the two sisters.

Education 
He attended his schooling till class Xth in St. M. G. Public School, Patna, Bihar. Further he started his Senior Secondary Study from Mahesh Singh Yadav College, Gaya, Bihar. Next to that he completed his engineering from Birla Institute of Technology, Mesra, Ranchi, Jharkhand.

Early Political Career 
Kumar Sarvjeet entered politics after the murder of his father, former MP Rajesh Kumar in Imamganj Constituency under an attack on his father's car near Madar village in Dumaria, Gaya district. This incident caused very severe damage to the politics of Bihar. After that Kumar Sarvjeet propelled himself to politics and was first elected as the representative in Bihar Legislative Assembly from Bodh Gaya (Vidhan Sabha constituency) in a By-Election to 14th Bihar Legislative Assembly held in the year 2009.

Political Career 
Kumar Sarvjeet had begun campaigning for the 16th Bihar Assembly. Following his advent into politics, he was credited with successfully modernising campaigning strategies and initiating digital outreach for the party. In the 2015 Bihar Legislative Assembly election, Kumar Sarvjeet stood as the candidate of the Mahagathbandan (Grand Alliance) from the Bodh Gaya (Vidhan Sabha constituency) and was elected as the representative of the constituency. The election also resulted in an overwhelming majority for the alliance in the assembly, which led to Kumar being appointed the Member of Bihar Legislative Assembly and in 2020 Bihar Legislative Assembly elections he again contested from the same reserved constituency of Bodhgaya and broke the record of getting elected twice by the people from Bodh Gaya (Vidhan Sabha constituency) and being the first representative to be elected as Member of the Legislative Assembly (India) from Bodh Gaya (Vidhan Sabha constituency) in 17th Bihar Assembly.

References 

Living people
People from Gaya district
1975 births
Rashtriya Janata Dal politicians

External links